Pogo is a village in the far north of Ivory Coast. It is in the sub-prefecture of Toumoukoro, Ouangolodougou Department, Tchologo Region, Savanes District. Two kilometres north of the village is a border crossing with Mali.

Pogo was a commune until March 2012, when it became one of 1126 communes nationwide that were abolished.

Notes

Former communes of Ivory Coast
Populated places in Savanes District
Ivory Coast–Mali border crossings
Populated places in Tchologo